The canton of Les Cévennes ardéchoises (before 2016: canton of Les Vans) is an administrative division of the Ardèche department, southern France. Its borders were modified at the French canton reorganisation which came into effect in March 2015. Its seat is in Les Vans.

It consists of the following communes:
 
Les Assions
Banne
Beaulieu
Beaumont
Berrias-et-Casteljau
Chambonas
Chandolas
Dompnac
Faugères
Gravières
Joyeuse
Lablachère
Laboule
Loubaresse
Malarce-sur-la-Thines
Malbosc
Montselgues
Payzac
Planzolles
Ribes
Rocles
Rosières
Sablières
Saint-André-de-Cruzières
Saint-André-Lachamp
Sainte-Marguerite-Lafigère
Saint-Genest-de-Beauzon
Saint-Mélany
Saint-Paul-le-Jeune
Saint-Pierre-Saint-Jean
Saint-Sauveur-de-Cruzières
Les Salelles
Valgorge
Les Vans
Vernon

References

Cantons of Ardèche